STS-64 was a Space Shuttle Discovery mission that was set to perform multiple experiment packages. STS-64 was launched from Kennedy Space Center, Florida, on 9 September 1994, and landed back on 20 September 1994 at Edwards Air Force Base.

Crew

Spacewalks 
 Lee and Meade  – EVA 1
EVA 1 Start: 16 September 1994 – 14:42 UTC
EVA 1 End: 16 September 1994 – 21:33 UTC
Duration: 6 hours, 51 minutes

Mission highlights

STS-64 marked the first flight of Lidar In-space Technology Experiment (LITE) and the first untethered U.S. extravehicular activity (EVA) in 10 years. LITE payload employs lidar, which stands for light detection and ranging, a type of optical radar using laser pulses instead of radio waves to study Earth's atmosphere. The first spaceflight of lidar was a highly successful technology test. The LITE instrument operated for 53 hours, yielding more than 43 hours of high-rate data. Unprecedented views were obtained of cloud structures, storm systems, dust clouds, pollutants, forest burning and surface reflectance. Sites studied included atmosphere above northern Europe, Indonesia and the south Pacific, Russia and Africa. Sixty-five groups from 20 countries made validation measurements with ground-based and aircraft instruments to verify LITE data. The LITE science program was part of NASA's Mission to Planet Earth. 

Mission Specialists Lee and Meade completed the 28th EVA of the Space Shuttle program on 16 Sept. During the six-hour, 15- minute EVA, they tested a new backpack called Simplified Aid for EVA Rescue (SAFER), designed for use in event crew member becomes untethered while conducting an EVA. Operations with SAFER marked the first untethered EVA since STS 51-A in 1984, and also the last such EVA of the program. SAFER went on to become a mainstay of US and joint spacewalks during the assembly of the International Space Station and beyond.

On the fifth day of the mission, the Shuttle Pointed Autonomous Research Tool for Astronomy-201 (SPARTAN-201) free flyer was released using the Remote Manipulator System arm. Making its second flight on the Shuttle, SPARTAN-201 was designed to collect data about the acceleration and velocity of the solar wind and to measure aspects of sun's corona. Data was recorded for playback after return to Earth. SPARTAN-201 was retrieved after two days of data collection.

Other cargo bay payloads: Shuttle Plume Impingement Flight Experiment (SPIFEX), a 33-foot (10-meter) long instrumented extension for Shuttle robot arm. SPIFEX designed to collect data about orbiter Reaction Control System (RCS) thrusters to aid understanding about potential effects of thruster plumes on large space structures, such as Mir space station or the planned international space station. The Robot Operated Processing System (ROMPS) was the first U.S. robotics system operated in space, mounted in two Get Away Special (GAS) canisters attached to the cargo bay wall. A GAS bridge assembly in the cargo bay carried 12 cans, 10 holding self-contained experiments.

Middeck experiments included: Biological Research in Canister (BRIC) experiment to investigate effects of spaceflight on plant specimens; Military Application of Ship Tracks (MAST) to take high-resolution imagery of ship tracks and to analyze wake formation and dissipations; Solid Surface Combustion Experiment (SSCE) to supply information on flame propagation over fuels in space; Radiation Monitoring Equipment III (RME III) to measure ionizing radiation; Shuttle Amateur Radio Experiment II (SAREX II) to demonstrate feasibility of short-wave radio contacts between orbiter and ground-based amateur radio operators; and Air Force Maui Optical Station (AMOS) test, which required no onboard hardware.

STS-64 was the first mission to see the use of the new full-pressure Advanced Crew Escape Suit, which eventually replaced the partial-pressure Launch Entry Suit.

See also 

 List of human spaceflights
 List of Space Shuttle missions
 Outline of space science
 Space Shuttle

References

External links
NASA mission summary 
STS-64 Video Highlights 

1994 in Florida
1994 in California
September 1994 events
Space Shuttle missions
Edwards Air Force Base
Spacecraft launched in 1994
Spacecraft which reentered in 1994